Brijlal Verma  (1916 - 19 July 1987) was a cabinet minister in Morarji Desai ministry in India. He held communication portfolio from 1977 to 1979 . He was elected to Lok Sabha from Mahasamund on a Janata Party ticket.

He died in 1987.

References

External links 

1916 births
1987 deaths
India MPs 1977–1979
Lok Sabha members from Chhattisgarh
People from Mahasamund district
Janata Party politicians
Commerce and Industry Ministers of India